Sir Cowasjee Jehangir (1879–1962) was 2nd Baronet of the Jehangir Baronets

Cowasjee Jehangir may also refer to:
Sir Cowasjee Jehangir, 1st Baronet
Sir Cowasjee Jehanghir, 4th Baronet (born 1953) of the Jehangir Baronets
Sir Cowasjee Jehangir, 5th Baronet (born 1990) of the Jehangir Baronets